Kelly Cristina Pereira da Silva (born 15 May 1985), commonly known as Kelly, is a Brazilian women's international footballer who plays as a forward. She was a member of the Brazil women's national football team. She was part of the team at the 2003 FIFA Women's World Cup.

Club career
Kelly played for CR Vasco da Gama, but was left without a club when they folded in 2001. She trained on her own for a period before joining Petrobras in mid-2003.

International career

Youth
Kelly played for Brazil women's national under-20 football team at the 2002 and 2004 editions of the FIFA U-20 Women's World Cup.

Senior
At the 2004 Athens Olympics, Kelly was part of Brazil's silver medal-winning squad. She appeared briefly as a substitute for Rosana in the 2–0 Group G defeat by the United States, but had to be substituted herself 12 minutes later after breaking her collarbone.

References

External links

1985 births
Living people
Brazilian women's footballers
Brazil women's international footballers
Place of birth missing (living people)
2003 FIFA Women's World Cup players
Women's association football forwards
Footballers at the 2003 Pan American Games
Footballers at the 2004 Summer Olympics
Medalists at the 2004 Summer Olympics
Olympic footballers of Brazil
Olympic silver medalists for Brazil
Olympic medalists in football
Pan American Games gold medalists for Brazil
Pan American Games medalists in football
Medalists at the 2003 Pan American Games